Nikhil Chavan is an Indian film actor known for his works in Marathi films and series. Nikhil was born on 29 May 1992 in Pune and he is known for his Marathi serial Lagira Zhala Ji, Karbhari Laybhari and ZEE5's original webseries Veergati. He played lead in Most Popular Regional Series Striling Pulling and also won the Zee Marathi Awards for Best Supporting Actor for Lagira Zhala Ji. He was ranked ninth in The Times of India's Top 20 Most Desirable Men of Maharashtra in 2020.

Career 
Nikhil started his career from backstage artist in commercial theater. He was trying very hard to showcase his acting skills and finally he gained recognition with his supporting role in the coming-of-age drama in Zee Marathi's serial named Lagira Zhala Ji. After this, he never looked back and he has many upcoming projects in upcoming years. He also won Best Supporting Actor award for his performance in his first Marathi Serial Lagira Zhala Ji.

In 2018, he acted as villain in a Marathi film Atrocity and he also hosted the show of Zee Marathi named as Jallosh Ganrayacha. Nikhil's first lead role was in most popular regional web series Strilling Pulling in 2019, written and directed by Sameer Asha Patil. After the release of Strilling Pulling, he reached next height of stardom and got acknowledge by Marathi Industry and this opened new doors of opportunity for him. This web series also won the Most Popular Regional Web Series Award powered by Brand Equity. Then, he got starred as lead in a patrotic ZEE5 Original Film Veergati in 2019.

He played guest appearance in Girlz, a Marathi film directed by Vishal Devrukhkar. His next film is a humorous and out of the box story of the Marathi film Dhondi Champya Ek Prem Katha, opposite Sayli Patil, Directed by Dnyanesh Bhalekar. Also, he is doing his first lead role in Marathi serial Karbhari Laybhari on Zee Marathi.

Filmography

Films

Web series

Serials

Plays 
 Three Cheers
 Raygadala Jevha Jaag Yete
 Pati Sagle Uchapati
 Ithe Oshalala Mrutyu

Awards

Personal life 
Nikhil completed his academic studies at the A.M. College, Pune. He began actively participating in play competitions since he began college. He was born in Pune, his mother name is Indira Chavan & father name is Nivas Chavan and his marital status is single.

References 

 निखिलचा चार्म आता वेबसिरीजमधून झळकणार Peeping Moon (In Marathi) Retrieved 9 January 2019.
 निखिलचा चार्म आता वेबसिरीजमधून झळकणार, 'लागिरं झालं जी' मालिकेतून पोहोचला घराघरात Divya Marathi (In Marathi) Retrieved 9 January 2019.
 लागिरं झालं जीचा विक्या आता वेबसिरीजमधून झळकणार Saamana (In Marathi) Retrieved 11 January 2019.
 निखिल चव्हाणची आणखी एक वेबसिरीज 'वीरगती' Peeping Moon (In Marathi) Retrieved 23 January 2019.
 'लागिरं...' फेम निखिल चव्हाण पुन्हा एकदा लष्करात Maharashtra Times (In Marathi) Retrieved 23 January 2019.
 मनोरंजनाच्या रणांगणात निखिलची नवी वेबसिरीज, 'स्त्रीलिंग पुल्लिंग'नंतर आता 'वीरगती'मध्ये दिसणार Divya Marathi (In Marathi) Retrieved 23 January 2019.
 विक्या पुन्हा दिसणार फौजीच्या भूमिकेत! Prahar (In Marathi) Retrieved 23 January 2019.
 वेबच्या रणांगणात निखिल चव्हाणची बाजी, आणखी एक वेब फिल्म वीरगती Lokmat (In Marathi) Retrieved 24 January 2019.
 प्रजासत्ताक दिनी निखिलने सांगितल्या खास आठवणी mymahanagar.com (In Marathi) Retrieved 26 January 2019.
 'धोंडी चंप्या' उलगडणार लव्हेबल केमिस्ट्री Pudhari (In Marathi) Retrieved 25 March 2019.
 'निखिल चव्हाण' आणि 'सायली पाटील' ची लव्हेबल फ्रेश जोडी लवकरच प्रेक्षकांच्या भेटीला! Marathi Cineyug (In Marathi) Retrieved 26 March 2019.
 'लागिरं झालं जी' फेम निखिल चव्हाण लवकरच येणार प्रेक्षकांच्या भेटीला! ETV Bharat (In Marathi) Retrieved 26 March 2019.
 निखिल चव्हाण म्हणतोय, 'मतदार राजा जागा हो, लोकशाहीचा धागा हो' Lokmat (In Marathi) Retrieved 13 April 2019.
 लोकसभा निवडणुकीच्या पार्श्वभूमीवर निखिलचा मतदारांना मोलाचा सल्ला Loksatta (In Marathi) Retrieved 13 April 2019.
 कलाकार निखिल चव्हाणचे मतदारांना आव्हान Tellychakkar (In Marathi) Retrieved 13 April 2019.
 प्रथमेश परब आणि निखिल चव्हाणच्या ‘डार्लिंग’चा धडाकेबाज ट्रेलर भेटीला Lokmat (In Marathi) Retrieved 15 April 2021.
 'डार्लिंग'च्या प्रेमात निखिल चव्हाण, म्हणतोय - 'आपण तिचा ओन्ली किंग!' Lokmat (In Marathi) Retrieved 15 April 2021.

External links 
 

1992 births
Indian film actors
Living people
Male actors in Marathi television